E 019 is a European B class road in Kazakhstan, connecting the cities Petropavl - Zapadnoe.

Route 

Petropavl
Zapadnoe

External links 
 UN Economic Commission for Europe: Overall Map of E-road Network (2007)

International E-road network
European routes in Kazakhstan